Kaleerwe is a neighborhood within Kampala, Uganda's capital and largest city. Kaleerwe is a busy road-side marketplace, beyond which is a residential slum. Due to its relative low altitude, compared to the surrounding hills, and its proximity to a wetland, the area is prone to flooding. Kaleerwe merges with its immediate slum-neighborhood to the southwest, Bwaise. One may argue that Kaleerwe is part of Bwaise.

Location
Kaleerwe is bordered by Kawempe to the north, Kyebando to the east, Makerere to the south, Bwaise to the southwest and Kazo to the west. It sandwiched between the Kampala-Masindi Highway to the west, the Kampala-Gayaza Highway to the east, the Kampala Northern Bypass Highway to the south. The coordinates of Kaleerwe are:0°21'07.0"N, 32°34'19.0"E (Latitude:0.351950; Longitude:32.571950).

Points of interest
 The Kampala Northern Bypass Highway, passes through the neighborhood in a general east to west direction. 
 The Kampala-Gayaza Highway passes through the neighborhood in a north to south direction.
 The Kaleerwe Central Market
 The Lubigi wetland has its origins in the streams and drainage channels in Kaleerwe.
 A branch of Equity Bank (Uganda)
 A branch of Finance Trust Bank
 Diamond Impex Supermarket - Located along Kampala-Gayaza Highway.

See also

References

External links
  Robbers Hiding Behind Graduation Gowns
  Road Works Kill Kaleerwe Business

Neighborhoods of Kampala
Kawempe Division